Mestobregma is a genus of band-winged grasshoppers in the family Acrididae. There are at least three described species in Mestobregma.

Species
These three species belong to the genus Mestobregma:
 Mestobregma impexum Rehn, 1919 (narrow-fronted grasshopper)
 Mestobregma plattei (Thomas, 1873) (Platte range grasshopper)
 Mestobregma terricolor Rehn, 1919 (dirt-colored grasshopper)

References

Further reading

 
 

Oedipodinae
Articles created by Qbugbot